Rosa Bailly (14 March 1890 – 14 June 1976), known also as Rosa Dufour-Bailly and Aimée Dufour was a French teacher, journalist and writer closely tied throughout her professional life to the cause of Poland and its literature. She was also a poet.

Biography
Bailly was born in Saint-Florent-sur-Cher in a modest family of farmers and artisans. She completed her education at the École Normale Supérieure de Sèvres, France. Although destined to become a school teacher, she never forgot the history lessons in primary school when she learned to her lasting horror of the partitions of Poland and its obliteration as a state. Later, she was to tell her colleagues:

"Apprenez à vos éléves que le démembrement de la Pologne en 1772 a sauvé la France, dites leurs que maintes fois le sang polonais à coulé à flot pour notre salut. Montrez leur la beauté de cette race intelligente, artiste et généreuse, son patriotisme et sa vitalité , son grand rôle historique …" – 'Teach your pupils that the dismemberment of Poland in 1772 saved France, tell them that Polish blood flowed many times to save us. Show them the beauty of that intelligent and artistic nation, its patriotism and its vitality, its great role in history ...'

She became a leading light of an association she founded in Paris, in 1919 under the name of Les Amis de la Pologne – The Friends of Poland, whose general secretary she was for many years. In 1921 she became an activist in the matter of a plebiscite about Upper Silesia joining the rest of a newly independent Second Polish Republic. She both translated into French and had published the works of many Polish writers, among them, Maria Konopnicka, Julian Tuwim, Leopold Staff, Zofia Nałkowska, Kazimierz Przerwa-Tetmajer, Zenon Przesmycki, Wacław Berent and Boleslaw Leśmian.

During World War II, Rosa Bailly organised assistance for Polish prisoners of war and soldiers in France. She continued her Polish contacts after the war and well into retirement, but the intensity and the welcome had waned with the advent of Polish communism. She visited there one last time in 1959 and wrote a history of Warsaw. 
She was also a great lover of the Pyrenees and finally settled in that region. She died in Pau in 1976, aged 86.

Bibliography
Selected works by Rosa Bailly connected to Poland:

1926, 1928, 1939 : Histoire de l'amitié franco-polonaise – A History of Franco-Polish friendship
1924 : La Pologne renaît – The rebirth of Poland
1926 (?) : Comment se renseigner sur la Pologne, Union française des amis de la Pologne – How to find out about Poland, French Union of the friends of Poland
1930 : L'Hommage de la France à Mickiewicz  – France's hommage to Mickiewicz
1928, 1938 : Petite histoire de la Pologne – A short history of Poland
1920–1930 : Villes de Pologne – Cities of Poland 
1920 : Vilno, ville polonaise – Wilno, a Polish city
1924 : À la gloire de Léopol – The glory of Lwów 
1927 : Une Ville polonaise : Bydgoszcz – Bydgoszcz, a Polish city 
1928 : Guide de Pologne : Poznań, Varsovie, Wilno, Cracovie, Léopol, Zakopane – A guide to Poland: Poznań, Warsaw, Wilnius, Kraków, Lwów, Zakopane
1936 : Au cœur de la Pologne : Petites villes, châteaux, campagnes – The heart of Poland: small towns, stately homes, countryside.
1940 : Lettres aux Polonais en France – Letters to Poles in France
1949 : Varsoviennes (traduction de Kobiety de Stanisława Kuszelewska) – Women of Warsaw (translation of a work in Polish by Stanislawa Kuszelewska)
1956 : A City Fights for Freedom: The Rising of Lwów in 1918-1919 - translated from the French by Samuel S. B. Taylor

Works about the author
 Mieczysława Wazdrag-Parisot, Rosa Bailly et la Pologne, Université de Paris-Sorbonne, 1980 
 Anita Plytarz, "Rosa Bailly, sa vie et ses liens d'amitié tissés avec la Pologne" in Synergies Pologne, revue du Gerflint, Cracovie, 2006
 Tadeusz Edward Domański, Rosa Bailly  : Wielka Francuzka o polskim sercu, Lublin, Norbertinum, 2003
 Małgorzata Nossowska, O Francuzce, która pokochała Polskę. Rosa Bailly i stowarzyszenie "Les Amis de la Pologne", Lublin, University of Maria Curie-Skłodowska, 2012,  – About the French woman who fell in love with Poland. Rosa Bailly and the association, Friends of Poland.

Portraits of her are by Nina Alexandrowicz, Zbigniew Więckowski ( in oil) and Maja Berezowska (water colour). The sculptor Francis Black has made a bust of her, which is in the Bibliothèque polonaise de Paris see"cracovia-leopolis" .

Awards and Distinctions
 1936 :  Commander of the Order of Polonia Restituta
 1937 : Prix de l'Académie française – prix Kornmann (1 000F)
 Laures académiques of the Polish Academy of Literature
 1969 : Prize of the Polish PEN Club
 1969 : Francis Jammes prize

See also
 Literary Association of the Friends of Poland
 Hotel Lambert
 France - Poland relations
 Franco-Polish alliance (1921)
 Poles in France

References 

1890 births
1976 deaths
People from Hautes-Pyrénées
20th-century French women writers
French women poets
Commanders of the Order of Polonia Restituta
20th-century French poets
20th-century French translators